Christian Anthony Garcia (born April 20, 1981), better known by his stage name Lucky Luciano, is an American rapper from Houston, Texas. After leaving Latium Records and Dope House Records, he is the current CEO of his label Steak N Shrimp Records, Playa Mexican Music Group, Bash Town Records, Diamond Lane Music Group.

Biography 
Garcia is Mexican-American yet he refers to himself as a "meskin". He was featured early on tracks by Baby Bash and South Park Mexican, which led to Lucky's appearance on SPM's The Purity Album.

Lucky Luciano received "Album of the Year" for his album Pimps Up Hoez Down at the 2006 Texas Latin Rap Awards. Lucky Luciano was named "Artist of the Year" at the 2009 Texas Latin Rap Awards. In 2009, Lucky also organized and produced "The Houston Latin Mic Pass" featuring many underground Houston artists.

Discography

Studio albums 
 2001: Lucky Me
 2003: You Already Know
 2005: Johnny Paycheck Vol. 1
 2005: The 4th Wish: To Sprinkle The World (Unreleased by Dope House Records)
 2005: Pimps Up, Hoez Down
 2007: Throwdest Playas Down Souf
 2008: Ahead of My Time
 2009: A New Movement
 2009: Purple Tagz 2K9
 2009: World Star Wetbacks
 2011: Money Bags
 2011: Addicted to Ballin 2017: 2017 Reasons

 Collaboration albums 
 2009: World Star Wetbacks (with Chingo Bling)
  2012: Family Business (with Low-G and Rasheed)
 2012: Playamade Mexicanz (with Baby Bash)
 2016: Latin Royalty (with GT Garza)
 2017: Playamade Mexicanz 2 (with Baby Bash)

 Remix albums 
 2003: You Already Know: Drapped & Dripped
 2005: Johnny Paycheck Vol. 1: Screwed
 2005: Playaz Paradise: All Flows
 2005: Pimps Up, Hoez Down: Screwed & Chopped
 2005: Throwdest Playas Down Souf: Screwed & Chopped
 2006: NAWF: Screwed & Chopped
 2006: Lavish Habits The Mixtape: Screwed & Chopped
 2013: Greatest Hits: Screwed & Chopped

 Extended plays 
 2013: I Did It (with LE$)
 2013: Dranked Out On the Mic
 2013: Gangsta's Paradise: Mai Tai Musik (with Blanco)
 2014: Luciano (with GT Garza)
 2015: A Deep Breath
 2021: Panic Attack

 Mixtapes 
 2003: H-Town Holdin 2004: All Dues Paid
 2005: Playas Paradise
 2006: Lost Flows
 2006: Lavish Habits The Mixtape
 2006: NAWF (with Stunta)
 2006: Playas Paradise 2
 2007: Back From Tour
 2007: NAWF II (with Stunta & Coast)
 2007: SNS2K7
 2007: Playa of the Year
 2007: Trick or Treat You Beezys!!!
 2008: ''H-Town Still Holdin
 2008: Playas Paradise 3: Return of the Mack 2008: G Status 4 Po'd Up & Pimped Out Edition (Hosted by Lucky Luciano)
 2008: Screwstone Vol. 1: Planet of the Drank 2008: Fuckin 'Em Up Vol. 6: Runnin' for Office 2008: Fuckin 'Em Up Vol. 7 2009: Nawfiana Jones 2009: Kings of Spring Break 4 (with Chingo Bling)
 2009: Thoed Essays (with Dat Boi T)
 2010: Recovery 2010: Bring It Back Vol. 4 (Hosted by Lucky Luciano)
 2010: Lucky Vuitton The Flyest Meskin Alive 2010: Thoed Essays 2 (with Dat Boi T)
 2010: Still Pimpin (with Smuc)
 2011: iBet This Bitch Jam 2011: Back From Vacation 2012: FAM: Fly Azz Meskins (with 2Throw'd)
 2012: Down In Texas (with Lil Ro)
 2012: Strapped Up N' Iced Out 2012: YouAintBoutThatLife 2013: Thoed Essays 3 (with Dat Boi T)
 2013: Nawf by Nawfwest 2013: Lucky Lucci da Grand Wizad 2013: SNS2K14 2014: Get Money Grind Hard or Starve (with Billy Dha Kidd)
 2014: Mob Musik (with Goldtoes)
 2014: Da God
 2014: We Just Ballin''' (with Drewskee)
 2014: NAWF III (with Stunta & Coast)
 2014: Breakin' Boys Off (with DJ Michael 5000 Watts)
 2015: Featuring Lucky 2015: Legendary 2015: Nawfs Most Wanted (with Revenue)
 2015: The Gate Keepa 2015: Nawfs Most Wanted 2 (with Revenue)
 2016: Cookin''' (with Rollie)

References 

1981 births
Living people
Gangsta rappers
Underground rappers
Place of birth missing (living people)
Rappers from Houston
American rappers of Mexican descent
21st-century American rappers
Hispanic and Latino American rappers